On 25 March 2018 at 16:00 local time (9:00 UTC), a fire engulfed the "Zimnyaya vishnya" shopping mall and entertainment complex in Kemerovo, Russia. It killed at least 60 people (more than half of which were children) according to official statements. The blaze started somewhere on the top floor of the four-story complex, and people were seen jumping from windows to escape it. 100 people were evacuated, and another 20 were rescued. Others claim the number of people killed in fire is being covered up, and that the real figure runs into the hundreds.

The Winter Cherry complex 
The Winter Cherry shopping and entertainment complex (torgovo-razvlekatel'nyi kompleks "Zimnyaya vishnya") is a mall in Kemerovo, Russia.

The mall, which was converted from a former communist-era confectionery factory, opened in 2013 with 23,000 square meters of space, which included a petting zoo, children's center and bowling alley. The building was described as a labyrinth with few windows and points of entrance to the upper levels, with one main staircase, one lift shaft and one escalator.

Fire 

Many of the victims were in the mall's three cinemas, where two of the cinema roofs collapsed from the fourth floor into the third.

Several of the victims in the cinemas were children watching Sherlock Gnomes to start off the first day of a week-long school break. A survivor from the cinema claimed that those in the cinema heard no alarm, and had to break through one door and jump to safety. Once on the ground, survivors could only see dense black pungent smoke that had filled the children's playground and the other cinema hall. The fire alarm system at Kemerovo shopping mall was switched off by a security guard.

Many children who were trapped in the fire called loved ones and friends to exchange last conversations and information. One deceased child's aunt recounted their conversation during the fire in which the victim stated; "everything burns and the doors are locked in the cinema."

A spokesperson for the Investigative Committee of Russia also stated that the fire exits in the building were blocked during the fire. Tajik shopkeepers saved around 50 people through an alternate exit. Staff and guards of the center were criticized by survivors for not arranging an organized evacuation effort, while some were praised for their efforts. A father of three deceased victims was critical of rescuers, claiming he led rescuers up the stairs, but they turned away after being ordered to go elsewhere and refused to give him a respiratory mask citing regulations. In an interview he angrily stated "My daughters were left to burn because of their bloody rules."

Over 600 first responders spent over 17 hours fighting the flames well into the next day after the fire started. The fire spread to cover more than 1,500 square meters of the 23,000 square meter building, and kept firefighters from entering the building for 12 hours due to the heat and smoke.

Victims 
At least 64 people were killed in the fire, 41 of them children. Also among the fatalities are some 200 animals from the petting zoo. Thirteen people had been hospitalized after the incident with the Russian Health Minister Veronika Skvortsova claiming the most gravely injured was an 11-year-old boy who jumped from a fourth-floor window.

Due to the fire, identification of most bodies had to have DNA identification used to confirm identifies. As of March 27, 60 individuals were treated in hospitals, of those 15 were hospitalized and 40 received outpatient care, and 25 victims, including 13 children had been identified.

Investigation 
The Investigative Committee of Russia (SKR), opened an investigation into the cause of the fire, with the head of the SKR responding critically to the staff. In a statement he claims "Most of the staff ran away and left parents and their children to their fate."

Four people have been detained in relation to the fire, including the head of the shopping complex's managing company. Investigators reported that the fire alarm system had not been working the week leading up to the fire, rising into conflict with a previous report that a security guard turned it off. The mall security guards were cited for failing to promptly turn the voice alert system on and that there is no reasonable explanation to why it occurred.

Kemerovo Oblast deputy governor Vladimir Chernov said that the preliminary suspicion is that a child had a cigarette lighter which ignited foam rubber in a children's trampoline room and erupted in the fashion of gunpowder. There is also speculation that the contracted builders and owners of the mall cut safety corners in the electrical wiring. Several arrests of these people have been made.

Legal 
The Investigative Committee of Russia brought charges under part 3 of Article 293 of the Russian Criminal Code; neglect of duty which has entailed by negligence the death of two or more persons, against the head of a firefighting unit No.2. According to investigation reports lead firefighter did not listen to an eyewitness, who reported that people were locked up on the fourth floor, but sent the unit to a farther location losing time.

Several other criminal cases were initiated with seven individuals being arrested.

Aftermath 

Politicians across the globe sent their condolences. 28 March 2018 was declared the national day of mourning in Russia.

A rally was held in Kemerovo demanding the resignation of Kemerovo Mayor Ilya Seredyuk and the longtime regional governor, Aman Tuleyev.
On April 1, 2018, Aman Tuleyev resigned as the governor of Kemerovo Oblast, citing "a heavy burden" of the Kemerovo fire, and President Putin accepted Tuleyev's resignation.

A spokeswoman for the Foreign Ministry criticized the announcement of expulsions of Russian diplomats by the United States and a number of European countries in connection to the poisoning of a former Russian spy and his daughter, which happened a day after the tragedy, as showing disrespect to the deceased victims.

Local media named the owner of the mall, as millionaire Denis Shtengelov. Shtengelov countered in an interview that his stake in the mall at the time of the fire was only a minority stake with other investors, however, he promised to pay compensation of 3-million rubles (about $52,500) to the family of each victim. This would be in addition to the regional government's reported compensation to the families of victims, which is equivalent to $17,500 each.

As of July 2018, the building is being demolished. In March 2019, a construction of a park designed by architect John Calvin Weidman, was started at the place of the demolished mall.

Memorials and tributes 
Across Russia, central squares were turned into memorials for those killed with flowers and candles. A local memorial was erected in a plaza outside of the shopping center, and there was an influx of individuals donating blood for those injured.

International memorials to the victims were erected in other locations, such as New York City.

See also 
 Lame Horse fire (2009)
 2015 Kazan Shopping Center fire
 2022 Kemerovo nursing home fire

References

External links 
 
 ТРК "Зимняя Вишня" / Winter Cherry Complex fire memorial website

2018 disasters in Russia
2018 fires in Europe
Fires in Russia
Fire disasters involving barricaded escape routes
Department store fires
Defunct shopping malls
2018
March 2018 events in Russia
Buildings and structures in Kemerovo Oblast
Shopping malls in Russia
Shopping malls established in 2013
2013 establishments in Russia
Building collapses in 2018
Building collapses in Russia
Building collapses caused by fire